Stung Treng (UNGEGN: Stœ̆ng Trêng ; , ; lit. "River of Reeds") is a province  of Cambodia in the northeast. It borders the provinces of Ratanakiri to the east, Mondulkiri and Kratié to the south and Kampong Thom and Preah Vihear to the west. Its northern boundary is Cambodia's international border with Laos. The Mekong River bisects the province. The province is mostly covered by forest, but logging and fishing put high pressure on the forest and fishery reserves.

Etymology
Originally, Stung Treng was named "Tonle Ropov (Khmer: ទន្លេរពៅ), which is now an area in Stung Treng called "Tonle Ropov Area" (Khmer: តំបន់ទន្លេរពៅ).

The name “Satung Teng (Khmer: សាទឹងទែង)" was founded by a monk named "Seang Peng (Khmer: សៀង ប៉េង) from Vientiane. The words “Satung Teng" have changed to "Xiang Taeng (Khmer: សៀងទែង). In Lao, the word "Xiang" means "goddess" who has resigned, while the word “Taeng” means "built".

Due to advancement in the Khmer language, it was later called "Stung Treng (Khmer: ស្ទឹងត្រែង)" which means a river of reeds.

History
Stung Treng was first a part of the Khmer Empire, then the Lao kingdom of Lan Xang, and later the Lao kingdom of Champasak. After the Franco-Siamese War of 1893, Chiang Taeng (Stung Treng) was administered by French Lower Laos from 1893 to 1904. In 1904 French Laos traded the province to the French Protectorate of Cambodia in exchange for Champassak, leaving a small Laotian minority in Cambodia.

Owing to its border location and the forested mountains in the northeast of the province, it was a hotbed of communist insurgent activity—and a target for U.S. bombs in the 1960s and 70s. The insurgency lasted from the Vietnamese infiltration in the 1950s until the late Khmer Rouge years.

Geography
Stung Treng province, which covers an area of 11,092 square kilometers borders Laos to the north, Ratanakiri to the east, Preah Vihear to the west and Kratié and Kampong Thom to the south.

Extensive forests, intersecting rivers and streams characterize it. Stung Treng includes also the western chunk of the massive Virachey National Park, accessible from Siem Pang. The province also features three big rivers—the Sekong River, the Sesan River and the Mekong—with its hundreds of small islands scattered on the river stretch in Stung Treng.

Until February 2022 it was one of the few provinces where you could see the rare and endangered Irrawaddy dolphin in the wild near the Laos border, Borei O’Svay Sen Chey District and Anlong Cheuteal in Stung Treng. Most likely due to illegal fishing activities in the area the population vanished by now.

Weather
In Stung Treng, the wet season is oppressive and overcast, the dry season is muggy and partly cloudy, and it is hot year-round. Over the course of the year, the temperature typically varies from 20 °C (67 °F) to 38 °C (100 °F) and is rarely below 16 °C (61 °F) or above 40 °C (105 °F).

Climate
On average, much rain (rainy season) falls in May, June, July, August, and September—the wettest season, with precipitation of 304.3 mm—and October. Stung Treng has dry periods in January, February and December—with January being the driest month. The warmest month is April with an average temperature of 35 °C (95 °F). The coldest month is January with an average temperature of 18 °C (64 °F).

Economy
Stung Treng's economy is solely based on agriculture. Various plantations such as timber, rubber and cash nuts are built all over the province. 85% of the population lives in rural parts of the province and depend on agriculture for their source of income. Animal breeding, fishing and silk weaving are also important industries in the province.

The Japan Oil, Gas and Metals National Corporation found a mineralized belt of copper and zinc in the province in 2019, and plans to step up further exploration with a Japanese partner to extract the minerals. The exploration site is about 260 kilometres north of Phnom Penh.

Administration
The province is divided into 5 districts, 1 municipality, 34 communes, and 128 villages.

2 districts Siem Bouk and Thala Barivat in west Mekong River

Notable people
 Ken Lo, Martial artist, actor, stuntman
 Sinn Sisamouth, Singer-songwriter

References

 
Provinces of Cambodia